National Route 333 is a national highway of Japan connecting Asahikawa, Hokkaidō and Kitami, Hokkaidō in Japan, with a total length of 172.1 km (106.94 mi).

References

National highways in Japan
Roads in Hokkaido